LoCash Cowboys is the self-titled second album of the American country music duo LoCash Cowboys. It was released on June 18, 2013 via Average Joes Entertainment.

Critical reception 
Giving it 4 stars out of 5, Matt Bjorke of Roughstock said that it "is the work of a band that has spent years honing their craft and while a thoroughly modern Country music album". It received a C+ rating from Joseph Hudak of Country Weekly, who said that "these guys believe the musical mayhem they're laying down" and thought that "Independent Trucker" was a highlight, but criticized the lyrics of "Hey Hey Hey" and "Fine".

Track listing 
"Hey Hey Hey" (Preston Brust, Chris Lucas, Jeffrey Steele) — 2:49
"Chase a Little Love" (Brust, Jaron Boyer) — 3:03
"Love Drunk" (Brust, Lucas, Skip Black) — 3:22
"Best Seat in the House" (Brust, Lucas, Aaron Barker) — 3:25
"Bounce" (Brust, Lucas, Chris Janson) — 2:28
"Make It Look Good" (Brust, Lucas) — 3:21
"Little Miss Crazyhot" (Brust, Lucas, Steve Dean, Wil Nance) — 2:40
"I Hope" (Brust, Lucas, Steele) — 3:41
"Fine" (Brust, Lucas, Steele) — 2:51
"Keep in Mind" (Steele, Shane Minor) —3:47
"Independent Trucker" (Steele, Chris Stapleton) — 3:45
featuring George Jones
"C.O.U.N.T.R.Y." (Brust, Lucas, Steele) — 3:53

Personnel 
 Larry Beaird - acoustic guitar
 Bruce Bouton - steel guitar
 Jim "Moose" Brown - keyboards
 Susan Brown - fiddle
 Steve Bryant - bass
 Pat Buchanan - electric guitar
 Nick Buda - drums, percussion
 Tom Bukovac - electric guitar
 J. T. Corenflos - electric guitar
 David Dorn - keyboards
 Howard Duck - steel drums
 Mike Durham - electric guitar
 Shannon Forrest - drums, percussion
 Larry Franklin - fiddle
 Noah Gordon - vocals
 Kevin Grantt - bass
 Rob Hajacos - fiddle
 Tommy Harden - drums, percussion
 Steve Hinson - steel guitar
 Mike Johnson - steel guitar
 George Jones - vocals
 Jeff King - electric guitar
 Steve Mackey - bass
 Russ Paul - steel guitar
 Steven Sheehan - acoustic guitar
 Jeffrey Steele - vocals
 David White - electric guitar
 John Willis - acoustic guitar
 Reese Wynans - piano

Chart performance

References 

2013 debut albums
LoCash albums
Average Joes Entertainment albums